Shin Yea-ji (born February 25, 1988 in Seoul, South Korea) is a South Korean figure skating coach and choreographer and former competitive figure skater. She is the 2007 South Korean national silver medalist. She competed for two seasons on the Junior Grand Prix circuit, and placed fourth at the 2007 Winter Universiade. Her highest placement at an ISU Championship was 8th at the 2007 World Junior Championships.

Work as a Choreographer 
Following Shin's retirement from competitive figure skating in 2009, she began her career as a choreographer.

She has choreographed for:
Kwak Min-jeong
Lee June-hyoung
Kim Jin-seo
Kim Hae-jin
Kyeong Jae-Seok
Cho Hee-soo
Lim Eun-soo
Kim Ha-nul
Kim Ye-lim
You Young
Cha Jun-hwan
Lee Hae-in
Lee Si-hyeong
Ji Seo-yeon
Cha Young-hyun
Wi Seo-yeong
Yun Ah-sun
Kim Chae-yeon
Song Si-woo	
Han Hee-sue
Shin Ji-a
Kwon Min-sol
Kim Yu-jae
Youn Seo-jin
Lee Jae-keun

Programs

Competitive highlights
JGP: Junior Grand Prix

Education
 Seoul Women's University
 Seoul Gwangmun High School

References

External links 
 

South Korean female single skaters
Figure skaters at the 2007 Winter Universiade
1988 births
Living people
Figure skaters at the 2007 Asian Winter Games
Figure skating choreographers